Margaretha Maria Antonetta 'Margriet' de Moor (née Neefjes; born 1941) is a Dutch pianist and writer of novels and essays. She won the AKO Literatuurprijs for her novel Eerst grijs dan wit dan blauw (1991).

Life and career
Margaretha Maria Antonetta Neefjes, born in Noordwijk, 21 November 1941, married sculptor Heppe de Moor (1938 - 1992). They had two daughters: writer Marente and visual artist Lara. After junior high and the Hogere Burgerschool she attended the Royal Conservatory of The Hague, where she studied piano and singing. Afterward she studied art history and archeology in Amsterdam and taught piano. With her husband, she began an artist salon in 1984 in 's-Graveland.

De Moor began writing, and after a failed attempt at a novel, debuted with a story collection, Op de rug gezien; the collection won her a literary award, the Gouden Ezelsoor, and a nomination for the AKO Literatuurprijs. Many of her works have been translated into German.

Literary awards
1989 – Gouden Ezelsoor, nomination for AKO Literatuurprijs for Op de rug gezien
1990 – Lucy B. en C.W. van der Hoogt-prijs for Dubbelportret
1992 – AKO Literatuurprijs for Eerst grijs dan wit dan blauw

Published works
Op de rug gezien (stories, 1988)
Dubbelportret (novellas, 1989)
Eerst grijs dan wit dan blauw (novel, 1991)
De virtuoos (novel, 1993)
Ik droom dus (stories, 1995)
Hertog van Egypte (novel, 1996)
Zee-Binnen (novel, 1999)
Verzamelde verhalen (stories, 2000)
Kreutzersonate - Een liefdesverhaal (novel, 2001)
Ze waren schoolmeesters (biography, 2001)
De verdronkene (novel, 2005)
De Kegelwerper (novel, 2006)
Als een hond zijn blinde baas (essays, 2007)
De schilder en het meisje  (novel, 2010)
De verdronkene (novel, 2010)
Mélodie d'amour (novel, 2013)

External links 

  Margriet de Moor at Digital Library for Dutch Literature

1941 births
Dutch essayists
Dutch women essayists
20th-century Dutch novelists
21st-century Dutch novelists
Dutch pianists
Dutch women pianists
Dutch translators
Dutch women novelists
Living people
People from Noordwijk
21st-century Dutch women writers
20th-century Dutch women writers
20th-century essayists
21st-century essayists
21st-century pianists
21st-century women pianists